The Bloukrans Bridge is an arch bridge located near Nature's Valley, Western Cape, South Africa.  Constructed by Concor between February 1980 and June 1983, the bridge stands at a height of 216m above the Bloukrans River. Its central span is 272m and the bridge is 451m in length in total. Its primary use is that of a road bridge, carrying national route N2.

Bloukrans Bridge is the site of the world's highest commercial bridge bungee jumping, Bloukrans Bridge Bungy, operated by Face Adrenalin since 1997. The Bloukrans River below forms the border between the Eastern Cape and Western Cape provinces and is located in the Tsitsikamma region of the Garden Route.

See also 
List of arch bridges by length
List of highest bridges in the world
Bloukrans Bridge Bungy

References

External links 

 
 Face Adrenalin, the bungee operators at the bridge.

Bridges in South Africa
Bridges completed in 1984
Concrete bridges
Deck arch bridges
N2 road (South Africa)